Laukkai (also known as Laukkaing or Laogai or Laokai;) is the capital of Kokang (also known as Special Region 1) in the northern part of Shan State, Myanmar. It is situated on the Salween River, which forms Myanmar's border with the People's Republic of China. In Laukkai, Southwestern Mandarin and Chinese characters are widely used, and the Chinese renminbi is in circulation. It is the main town of Laukkaing Township of the Kokang Self-Administered Zone. Its population is 23,435.

It was a center of fighting in the August 2009 Kokang incident; on 24 August, it was occupied by Tatmadaw troops (Burma's military junta).

On 17 February 2015, Myanmar president Thein Sein declared a state of emergency three-month period of martial law in Kokang in response to fighting between government troops and the Myanmar National Democratic Alliance Army, a rebel group.

See also
 Myanmar National Democratic Alliance Army (MNDAA)
Kokang incident
2015 Kokang offensive

References

Populated places in Shan State
Kokang
China–Myanmar border crossings